I'm Dickens, He's Fenster is an American sitcom starring John Astin and Marty Ingels that ran on ABC from September 28, 1962 to May 10, 1963. The series was created and produced by Leonard Stern and filmed at Desilu.

Synopsis
The series starred John Astin and Marty Ingels as trouble-prone carpenters Harry Dickens and Arch Fenster. Emmaline Henry appeared as Harry's wife, Kate. Appearing regularly, at Dickens and Fenster's workplace, were Frank DeVol (as their mild-mannered boss Myron Bannister), David Ketchum (as Mel Warshaw), Henry Beckman (as Bob Mulligan), and Noam Pitlik (as Bentley). Fenster always had attractive girlfriends; some of these actresses included Yvonne Craig, Ellen Burstyn (as Ellen McRae), and Lee Meriwether. The series was sponsored alternately by El Producto cigars and Procter and Gamble.

I'm Dickens, He's Fenster was filmed in front of a live audience which, in that era, was unusual for a show not built around an established star such as Lucille Ball or Danny Thomas. The scripts were filled with comic situations and sight gags, supplied by such veteran comedy writers as creator-producer Leonard Stern, Mel Tolkin, Don Hinkley, Danny Simon, and Barry Blitzer. The theatrical approach, combining witty remarks with moments of broad slapstick comedy, was well received by the audience, whose laughter sometimes drowned some of the dialogue.

The program followed the cartoon series The Flintstones and preceded 77 Sunset Strip on Fridays at 9 p.m. Eastern time. It won critical raves, but was programmed opposite two major hits: Sing Along with Mitch starring Mitch Miller and Route 66. By the time I'm Dickens, He's Fenster had attracted a following and had beaten its competition, ABC had canceled it. The series ran for only 32 episodes and was canceled in 1963.

Three years later (1966), John Astin and Marty Ingels were reunited in an episode of The Addams Family, on which Astin starred. In the episode "Cat Addams", Ingels played the role of veterinarian Marvin P. Gunderson, called by the Addams to treat Kitty Cat.

Episodes

Home media
On April 10, 2012, Lightyear Entertainment & TV Time Machine Productions released I'm Dickens, He's Fenster- 50th Anniversary Collectors Edition: Volume 1 on DVD in Region 1.  The 3-disc set contains the first 16 episodes of the series as well as several bonus features.

References

External links
  
  
I'm Dickens, He's Fenster website authorized by creator/producer Leonard Stern

1962 American television series debuts
1963 American television series endings
1960s American sitcoms
1960s American workplace comedy television series
American Broadcasting Company original programming
Black-and-white American television shows
English-language television shows
Television duos
Television series by CBS Studios
Television shows set in Los Angeles